The View from Here: Conversations with Gay and Lesbian Filmmakers is a book by Canadian film journalist Matthew Hays, published in 2007 by Arsenal Pulp Press.

Filmmakers interviewed in the book include John Waters, Pedro Almodóvar, Gus Van Sant, John Cameron Mitchell, Don Roos, Randal Kleiser, Don Mancini, Kenneth Anger, Gregg Araki, Léa Pool, Wakefield Poole, Monika Treut, Rosa von Praunheim, John Greyson, Bruce LaBruce, Robert Lepage, Patricia Rozema, Janis Cole, David Secter, Lynne Fernie and Aerlyn Weissman.

The book won a Lambda Literary Award in 2008 in the category of LGBT Arts and Culture.

See also 
 List of lesbian filmmakers
 Women in film

References

External links
 The View from Here: Conversations with Gay and Lesbian Filmmakers at Arsenal Pulp Press

2007 non-fiction books
Canadian non-fiction books
Non-fiction books about same-sex sexuality
LGBT literature in Canada
Lambda Literary Award-winning works
LGBT-related film
Non-fiction books about film directors and producers
2000s LGBT literature
Arsenal Pulp Press books